All Saints' Church is an Anglican Church and the parish church of Pitsford. It is a Grade II* listed building and stands on the west side of Church Lane on the northern edge of the village.

History
There is no reference to a church or priest in the entry for Pitsford in the Domesday Book of 1086. Parts of the church date to the Norman Conquest, with the tympanum over the main church door dating to that period.

The main structure of the present building was erected in the 12th to 14th centuries. Restoration in 1867 included rebuilding of the south aisle, porch and chancel and extensive internal alterations. The church consists of a nave, north and south aisles, chancel and west tower. Detailed descriptions appear on the Historic England website and in the Victoria County History of Northamptonshire.

The parish registers survive from 1560, the historic registers being deposited at Northamptonshire Record Office.

Present day
On 2 November 1954, the church was designated a Grade II* listed building. Pitsford is part of a united benefice along with Boughton. Each parish retains its own church building.

References

Grade II* listed churches in Northamptonshire
13th-century church buildings in England
14th-century church buildings in England